The 2017–18 RFU Junior Vase is the 28th version of the RFU Junior Vase national cup competition (9th using the name RFU Junior Vase) for clubs at level 9 and below of the English rugby union system. The competition consists of 134 clubs divided into four regions. The winners of each region then advance to the national semi-finals with the final being held at Twickenham Stadium in London at the end of the season, along with the RFU Intermediate Cup and RFU Senior Vase finals.

The 2017–18 champions were Yorkshire club, Old Otliensians, who defeated the Devon side, South Molton, 31–21 in the final. Old Otliensians were worthy winners of the competition, scoring over 260 points on route to the final, whilst conceding only 15, a run which included a club record 126–0 over Wallsend in the early stages. Old Otliensians victory was the 11th by a Yorkshire club since the competition began in 1990.

London & South East Junior Vase

The London & South East Junior Vase involves a knock-out competition with 1st round, 2nd round, 3rd round, 4th round, semi-finals and final. The winners of the London & South East Junior Vase then go on to the national Junior Vase semi-finals where they face the winners of the South West Junior Vase. There are 55 teams involved in the London & South East Junior Vase, all of which are 1st XV sides, coming from the following unions and leagues.

Round 1

Byes: Ashford (K1), Bognor (H1), Burgess Hill (SX1), Cranbrook (K1), Gillingham Anchorians (K1), Millbrook (H1), Royston (HM1), Sandown & Shanklin (H1), Uckfield (SX1)

Round 2

Round 3

Round 4

Semi-finals

Final

The winners of the London & South East Junior Vase final would advance to the national semi-finals.

Midlands Junior Vase

The Midlands Junior Vase is a direct knockout cup with a 1st round, 2nd round, 3rd round, quarter-finals, semi-finals and final The winner of the final goes forward to the National Vase semi-finals where they face the winners of the Northern section. The competition involves 50 clubs from the following unions and level 9-10 leagues:

Round 1

Byes: Amber Valley (M5EN), Ashfield (M4EN), Aston Old Edwardians (M4WN), Bedford Swifts (M4ES), Bloxwich (M4WN), Brackley (M4ES), Burbage (M4WS), Harbury (M4WS), Keresley (M5WS), Mansfield Woodhouse (M5EN), Mellish (M4EN), St Leonards (M5WN), St Neots (M4ES), Tupton (M4EN)

Round 2

Round 3

Quarter-finals

Semi-finals

Final

The winners of the Midlands Junior Vase would advance to the National Junior Vase semi-finals.

Northern Junior Vase

Unlike the other regional competitions, the Northern Junior Vase starts with a mini-league stage, in which the eligible clubs are placed in 2 regional pools of 3 teams each. The winners of each pool then face each other in the Northern Vase final, with the winner advancing to the National Junior Vase semi-finals, where they will face the winners of the Midlands section. There are 6 teams (1st XV only) involved in the Northern Junior Vase representing the following unions and leagues:

Pool 1 (West)

Pool 2 (East)

Final

The winners of the Pool 1 (West) and Pool 2 (East) would meet in the Northern Junior Vase final. The winners of this final would then advanced to the National Junior Vase semi-finals.

South West Junior Vase

The South West Junior Vase consist of three stages, with representatives from the different unions joining at different points. The Dorset & Wilts and Gloucestershire clubs first play in county based knock-out tournaments, with the winners advancing to either the Southern Counties or South West Counties area semi-finals, where they join the other south-west representatives. The winners of each area final then meet in the South West Junior Vase final to determine who goes through to the national semi-finals, where they face the winners of the London and South East section.

The South West Junior Vase involves 23 clubs (1st XV only) from the following unions and leagues:

Stage 1 (Dorset & Wilts)

10 teams were involved in the Dorset & Wilts RFU Junior Vase qualification. The winners would advanced to the Southern Counties semi-finals.

Stage 1 (Gloucestershire)

8 teams were involved in the Gloucestershire RFU Junior Vase qualification tournament. The winners of the competition would go through to the South West Counties final.

Stage 2 (Southern Counties)

The winners of the Dorset & Wilts Junior Vase would join representatives from the Berkshire, Buckinghamshire and Oxfordshire unions in the Southern Counties knock-out stage. The winners would advance to play the South West Counties winners in the south-west regional final.

Stage 2 (South West Counties)

The winners of the Gloucestershire Junior Vase would meet the representatives from the Somerset RFU in the semi-final, while the representatives from Devon RFU had a bye into the South West Counties final due to Cornish clubs not taking part this season. The winners would advance to play the Southern Counties winners in the south-west regional final.

Stage 3 (South West final)

The winners of the Southern Counties and South West Counties final would meet in the south-west regional final. The winners of this final would then advanced to the national semi-finals.

National Junior Vase

4 teams qualified from the regional vase competitions:
London & South East Junior Vase – Chipstead (SY1)
Midlands Junior Vase – Eccleshall (M4WN)
Northern Junior Vase – Old Otliensians (Y3)
South West Junior Vase – South Molton (D1)

The Midlands winners would face the North winners in the first semi-final, while the London & South East winners would face the South-West winners in the other, with the winners of each semi-final meeting in the Twickenham final. Home advantage in the semi-finals will be decided by a draw.

Semi-finals

Final

Notes

See also
 2017–18 Anglo-Welsh Cup
 2017–18 British and Irish Cup
 2017–18 RFU Intermediate Cup
 2017–18 RFU Senior Vase
 English rugby union system
 List of English rugby union teams
 Rugby union in England

References

External links
 RFU

2017–18 rugby union tournaments for clubs
Rugby union competitions in England
Rugby union cup competitions in England